The 2007–08 Kazakhstan Hockey Championship was the 16th season of the Kazakhstan Hockey Championship, the top level of ice hockey in Kazakhstan. Ten teams participated in the league, and Barys Astana won the championship.

Standings

First round

Final round

References
Kazakh Ice Hockey Federation

Kazakhstan Hockey Championship
Kazakhstan Hockey Championship seasons
1